Annie Coupe Speirs (14 July 1889 – 26 October 1926), also known by her married name Annie Coombe, was a British competition swimmer who won a gold medal in the women's 4×100-metre freestyle relay at the 1912 Summer Olympics in Stockholm, Sweden.  Individually, she finished fifth in the women's 100-metre freestyle event.

See also
 List of Olympic medalists in swimming (women)
 World record progression 4 × 100 metres freestyle relay

References

External links
 
 

1889 births
1926 deaths
Sportspeople from Liverpool
English female swimmers
English Olympic medallists
English female freestyle swimmers
Olympic swimmers of Great Britain
Swimmers at the 1912 Summer Olympics
Olympic gold medallists for Great Britain
Medalists at the 1912 Summer Olympics
World record setters in swimming
Olympic gold medalists in swimming